Highland Lake is a hamlet in Sullivan County, New York, United States. Highland Lake has a post office with ZIP code 12743, which opened on June 18, 1897.

The lake is at an elevation of 408m / 1339 feet  and covers a surface area of 198.3 acres (80.3 hectares). The maximum depth is approx 21 ft.

Since 2012, there have been no confirmed toxic algal blooms, although there was a suspicious bloom in 2019 (page 22 of 25).

References

Hamlets in Sullivan County, New York
Hamlets in New York (state)